Paul Stuart Mardle (born 10 November 1962 in Norwich, England) is a male former discus thrower.

Athletics career
Mardle represented Great Britain at the 1988 Summer Olympics where he finished in 20th place in the discus event.

He was twice a representative of England at the Commonwealth Games in 1986 and 1990. He represented England finishing fourth, at the 1986 Commonwealth Games in Edinburgh, Scotland. Four years later he represented England finishing fifth, at the 1990 Commonwealth Games in Auckland, New Zealand.

Domestically, he won seven national titles including three AAA titles and six UK Championships.

Personal life
His son, Matthew Paul Rory Mardle, competed at the Inter Schools Championship in 2009 under Paul's tuition, coming second.

National titles
UK Championships: 1984, 1985, 1987, 1988, 1990, 1991
AAA Championships: 1987, 1988, 1989

References

1962 births
Living people
Sportspeople from Norwich
British male discus throwers
English male discus throwers
Olympic athletes of Great Britain
Athletes (track and field) at the 1988 Summer Olympics
Commonwealth Games competitors for England
Athletes (track and field) at the 1986 Commonwealth Games
Athletes (track and field) at the 1990 Commonwealth Games